The list of number-one singles of 1995 in Italy includes all the song that reached the top spot on the weekly chart compiled by the Italian music magazine Musica e dischi. 
Musica e dischi also compiled a weekly albums chart in 1995, but in March of the same year, the Federation of the Italian Music Industry started its own chart, which replaced Musica e dischi'''s one as the official Italian albums chart. Compiled by Nielsen, the first FIMI albums chart included sales for the week starting on 23 February 1995. This period coincided with the first week of sales for the albums released by the 45th Sanremo Music Festival contestants, the most important music event in Italy.

Albums

The album with the most weeks at number one on the FIMI albums chart of 1995 was 883's La donna, il sogno & il grande incubo, which spent ten weeks atop the chart. Made in Heaven by Queen and Non calpestare i fiori nel deserto by Pino Daniele spent six weeks at number one, while Zucchero's Spirito DiVino and Claudio Baglioni's Io sono qui'' collected four weeks in the top spot.

Singles

See also
 1995 in music

References

1995
One
1995 record charts